Finding Macpherson is a Canadian documentary film, directed by Serge Giguère and released in 2014. The film centres on animator Martine Chartrand's complex eight-year process of making her 2011 short film Macpherson, including her research into the life of Frank Randolph MacPherson, the Jamaican immigrant to Canada who had inspired Félix Leclerc's song "Macpherson".

The film won the Prix Jutra for Best Documentary Film at the 17th Jutra Awards in 2015.

References

External links
 

2014 films
2014 documentary films
Canadian documentary films
Quebec films
National Film Board of Canada documentaries
Documentary films about women in film
Documentary films about Black Canadians
French-language Canadian films
2010s Canadian films
Best Documentary Film Jutra and Iris Award winners